Saliciphaga is a genus of moths belonging to the subfamily Olethreutinae of the family Tortricidae.

Species
Saliciphaga acharis (Butler, 1879)
Saliciphaga caesia Falkovitsh, 1962

See also
List of Tortricidae genera

References

External links
Tortricid.net

Endotheniini
Tortricidae genera